Shirley Goldfarb (August 4, 1925 – September 28, 1980) was an American painter and writer.

Biography 
Goldfarb was born in Altoona, Pennsylvania. In 1949, she moved to New York City, where she received a scholarship to study at the Art Students League of New York from 1952-1953. She also studied in Woodstock, New York under the guidance of Nahum Tschachbasov, and at the Skowhegan School of Painting and Sculpture in Maine. In 1954, Goldfarb moved to Paris, where she spent the remainder of her life.

She was the wife of artist Gregory Masurovsky. In 1994, a compilation of Goldfarb's journal entries were published under the title Carnets: Montparnasse 1971-1980.

Goldfarb was noted for her technique of applying spots of paint to her canvases with a palette knife, in the style of abstract expressionism, with minimalist tendencies.

Exhibitions 
 Shirley Goldfarb. Galerie Zabriskie, Paris, France. November 14, 1991 – January 8, 1992.
 Shirley Goldfarb. Zabriskie Gallery, New York, N.Y. August 1-September 23, 2000.
 Shirley Goldfarb: A Retrospective. Loretta Howard Gallery, New York, N.Y. April 25-June 8, 2013.

References

1925 births
1980 deaths
20th-century American women artists
Artists from Pennsylvania
Art Students League of New York alumni
People from Altoona, Pennsylvania
Skowhegan School of Painting and Sculpture alumni